Justin B. Smith (born August 13, 1969) is an American media executive. He co-founded Semafor, a global news organization in 2022. He was previously the chief executive officer of Bloomberg Media Group. Prior to joining Bloomberg, Smith worked for Atlantic Media, The Week magazine and The Economist.

Career
Smith began his career at the Department of State in 1991, working in the U.S. Embassy at Ouagadougou, the capital of Burkina Faso, under Ambassador Edward Brynn. After leaving the State Department, Smith joined the International Herald Tribune. He worked in Paris and in Hong Kong, where he helped build the newspaper's conference business. Smith then joined The Economist as the head of corporate strategy, working from London, Hong Kong and New York City.

In 2001, Smith joined The Week, where he helped launch a U.S. version of the weekly news magazine founded in London. In 2005, Smith was promoted to president of the magazine. In 2006, he had helped The Week reach more than 443,000 U.S. subscribers. While at The Week, Smith was named to AdAge’s “40 Under 40” list.

In 2007, Smith was hired as president of Atlantic Consumer Media at The Atlantic. In 2010, the magazine made $1.8 million, the first time the magazine had been profitable in decades. Smith was promoted to president of Atlantic Media Company which gave him responsibility over National Journal and Government Executive.
While at The Atlantic, Smith oversaw the launch of several digital brands. In 2009, the company launched The Atlantic Wire, a news content and aggregation site now called The Wire. Site traffic reached nearly one million monthly visitors within one year of launch. In 2012, the company launched Quartz  for business news. And in 2013, the company launched Defense One for reporting on national security.

In 2010, Smith and The Atlantic publisher Jay Lauf were named Ad Age’s Publishing Executives of the Year, and The Atlantic was ranked second on Ad Age’s list of A-list magazines.

Smith is also the founder of Breaking Media, a collection of specialized websites that includes Above the Law, Dealbreaker and Fashionista.

Bloomberg
In July 2013, Bloomberg LP hired Justin Smith as the chief executive officer of Bloomberg Media Group, which comprises Bloomberg Television, Bloomberg Radio, Bloomberg Businessweek, and digital businesses globally. Smith reports to Bloomberg LP President and CEO Dan Doctoroff. Later that year, Smith stated he would focus on launching additional online destinations at Bloomberg beyond its current slate of news sources and invest more in digital video.

In April 2014, Smith hired veteran journalists Mark Halperin and John Heilemann, who wrote Game Change and Double Down: Game Change 2012 on the 2008 and 2012 presidential elections respectively, to create a new Bloomberg website focused on American politics and policy.

In 2014, The Hollywood Reporter named Smith one of the "35 Most Powerful People in New York Media."

In 2015, Mike Bloomberg called Smith one of the "smartest and most innovative people in media."

In January 2022, he stepped down as CEO to found Semafor (website) with form er The New York Times journalist Ben Smith (journalist).

Personal
Smith was born on August 13, 1969, in Hartford, Connecticut. He attended Phillips Andover Academy and graduated from the School of Foreign Service at Georgetown University in 1991. Smith is a member of the Georgetown University Board of Directors and is a lifetime member of the Council on Foreign Relations. He is the founder of the Bali Purnati Center for the Arts on the island of Bali and the Ouagadougou Education project. In 2013, Smith was named a Henry Crown Fellow at the Aspen Institute, and in 2014, he was named to the board of directors for the Elizabeth Glaser Pediatric AIDS Foundation.

References

21st-century American businesspeople
1969 births
Bloomberg L.P. people
Walsh School of Foreign Service alumni
Living people
Henry Crown Fellows
International Herald Tribune people
American media executives